Chirag is a 1969 Indian Bollywood film directed by Raj Khosla.

Chirag may also refer to:

People
Chirag Gandhi (born 1990), Indian first-class cricketer
Chirag Pratap Lingam Goud aka Pedhanna (1921–1982), former MLA in Andhra Pradesh
Chirag Jain (born 1985), Indian poet, satirist, humourist and author
Chirag Jani (born 1989), Indian cricketer
Chirag Jani (actor), Indian actor
Chirag Khurana (born 1992), Indian cricketer
Chirag Odhav, American youth volunteer
Chirag Parmar (born 1990), Indian cricketer
Chirag Paswan, Indian politician
Chirag Pathak (born 1987), Indian first-class cricketer
Chirag Patil (born 1993), Indian actor
Chirag Ali Shah (died 1983), Indo-Fijian farmer and politician
Chirag Shetty (born 1997), Indian badminton player
Chirag Suri (born 1995), Indian cricketer
Chirag Vohra, Indian television, stage and film actor

Geography
Chirag, Republic of Dagestan, rural locality in Agulsky District, Republic of Dagestan
Chirag Gala, a ruined ancient fortress near Baku, Azerbaijan
Chirag oil field, an offshore oil field in the Caspian Sea

Other
Chirag language, a language spoken in Dagestan, Russia
Chirag United Sports Club, an Indian football Club from Kolkata, West Bengal, India
Chirag Gupta, a fictional character in the Diary of a Wimpy Kid book series

See also